A by-election was held in the federal riding of Medicine Hat—Cardston—Warner in Alberta, Canada, on 24 October 2016 following the death of Conservative MP Jim Hillyer. The safe seat was held by the Conservative candidate Glen Motz on a reduced majority.

The by-election was the first to be held in the 42nd Canadian Parliament.

Background

Constituency 

The constituency covers the City of Medicine Hat and surrounding areas in the southeast corner and southern U.S. border region of Alberta, including Cypress County, the County of Forty Mile No. 8, Warner No. 5 and the Town of Warner, and Cardston County and the Town of Cardston.

Representation 
The riding has been held by centre-right parties since Bert Hargrave defeated Liberal incumbent Bud Olson, himself a former Social Credit MP, in 1972. This was the first by-election in the 108-year history of the Medicine Hat constituency. The seat was vacated on March 23, 2016, when Conservative Party of Canada MP Jim Hillyer died in his office following a heart attack.

Campaign 
The Speaker's warrant regarding the vacancy was received on March 24, 2016.

Candidates 
Retired Medicine Hat Police inspector Glen Motz defeated businessman Brian Benoit, former Cardston-Taber-Warner and Calgary-Glenmore MLA Paul Hinman, lawyer Michael W. Jones, and party worker Joe Schow for the Conservative nomination, which was held in late June. Cypress-Medicine Hat MLA Drew Barnes, former Medicine Hat MLA Blake Pedersen, and Dan Hein, Hillyer's closest competitor for the nomination in 2015, all declined to run for the Conservative nomination despite speculation to the contrary.

Well-known Medicine Hat businessman Stan Sakamoto was the Liberal candidate.

The Libertarian Party of Canada nominated Sheldon Johnston as its candidate. The Libertarians and the Rhinoceros Party nominated candidates for the first time in Medicine Hat.

Results

2015 result

References 

2016 elections in Canada
2016 in Alberta
Federal by-elections in Alberta
Politics of Medicine Hat
October 2016 events in Canada